Aleksei Nikolayevich Kazalov (born 3 February 1967) is a Russian professional football coach and a former player who works as an assistant manager with FC Shinnik Yaroslavl.

He made his professional debut in the Russian Second Division in 1992 for FC Vympel Rybinsk. He played 4 games and scored 1 goal in the UEFA Intertoto Cup 1998 for FC Shinnik Yaroslavl.

References

1967 births
Footballers from Yaroslavl
Living people
Russian footballers
Association football midfielders
FC Shinnik Yaroslavl players
FC Amkar Perm players
FC Arsenal Tula players
Russian Premier League players
Russian football managers
FC Shinnik Yaroslavl managers